Yowlqonluy, also rendered as Yowlqunlu and Yulqunlu,  may refer to:
 Yowlqonluy-e Jadid
 Yowlqonluy-e Qadim